Filmworks XII: Three Documentaries is an album containing three scores by John Zorn for documentary films released on Zorn's own label, Tzadik Records, in 2002. It features music that Zorn wrote and recorded for Homecoming (2002), a tribute documentary about the dance program at Performance Space 122 in New York by Charles Dennis, Shaolin Ulysses (2002) a film by Mei-Juin Chen and Martha Burr that follows Shaolin monks living and training in the United States, and Family Found (2002), a portrait of outsider artist Morton Bartlett which was directed by Emily Harris.

Reception
The Allmusic review by Thom Jurek awarded the album 4½ stars noting that "The music here is, not unexpectedly, all over the map, but Zorn's focus is not; he is a keen student of the image, and listening to the way he crafts his music for the movies is more than a little revealing of his intensely methodological approach to seeing both the image as it unfolds and the music itself as it tends carefully to the projected frame... Zorn's Film Works volumes keep on coming, with each one being more complex, asking more questions, and composed more beautifully than the last. This is among the finest recordings of his music ever released".

Track listing
 "Vocal Phase" 				-			 3:49
 "The Lips At Sway" 			-			 5:07
 "The Well Tuned Harmonica" 		-			 1:35
 "Dance Piece" 				-			 2:10
 "Midnight Flight" 				-			 2:12
 "Chippy Charm" 				-			 1:35
 "Shaolin Spirit" 				-			 3:01
 "Bamboo Forest" 				-			 1:24
 "Shaolin Ulysses" 				-			 2:00
 "Shaolin Bossa" 				-			 3:16
 "Travelling West" 			-			 2:43
 "Temple Song" (traditional) -	 2:25
 "Shaolin Family" 				-			 1:16
 "Nostalgia" 				-			 0:54
 "Shaolin Mambo" 				-			 2:57
 "Transition" 				-			 1:25
 "Shaolin Bossa" (fast) 			-			 2:22
 "Vegas" 					-			 1:03
 "Kung Fu Percussion" 			-			 1:50
 "Shaolin Spirit" (duo) 			-			 5:12
 "Shaolin Bossa Vibe" 			-			 1:54
 "Shaolin Dream" 				-			 1:43
 "Shaolin Ulysses" (end titles) 		-			 2:10
 "Family Found" (vocal) 			-			 2:33
 "Family Found" (solo arco) 		-			 1:09
 "Family Found" (solo pizz) 		-			 0:46
 "Family Found" (cello) 			-			 2:31

All Music by John Zorn (except 12 - arranged by John Zorn)
Produced by John Zorn
Recorded at Frank Booth, Brooklyn (New York) in 2002

Personnel
John Zorn (1-6) - organ, glass harmonica, Wurlitzer piano
Mark Feldman (1-6) - violin
Jennifer Charles (1, 24-27) - voice
Jamie Saft (2) - Wurlitzer piano
Marc Ribot (7-23) - guitar
Min Xiao-Fen (7-23) - pipa
Trevor Dunn (7-23) - bass
Roberto Juan Rodríguez (7-23) - percussion
Cyro Baptista (7-23) - percussion
Erik Friedlander (24-27) - cello

References

Tzadik Records soundtracks
Albums produced by John Zorn
John Zorn soundtracks
2002 soundtrack albums
Film scores
Soundtrack compilation albums
Tzadik Records compilation albums